Yuanyang may refer to:

Mandarin duck, also known as yuanyang
Yuenyeung, a popular beverage in Hong Kong, named after the mandarin duck
Yuanyang County, Henan
Yuanyang County, Yunnan, well known for its spectacular rice-paddy terracing
Yuanyang (character), in the Chinese novel Dream of the Red Chamber